Kelvin Central Buses was a bus operator in Scotland. Formed as a subsidiary of the Scottish Bus Group in July 1989 from the merger of Kelvin Scottish and Central Scottish, it was sold in a management buyout and in July 1998 became part of First Glasgow.

History
In March 1989, Central Scottish's legal name was changed in preparation for its July 1989 merger with Kelvin Scottish to Kelvin Central Buses (KCB) in preparation for privatisation. KCB had a difficult beginning with ongoing industrial action. By the time the dispute was resolved a number of new operators had stepped in to take on the abandoned services. Whereas Kelvin had been one of the more successful of the Scottish Bus Group subsidiaries, Central was financially weakened, suffered from heavy competition and burdened with a large debt.

KCB was the largest operator in Dumbartonshire and Lanarkshire operating services in the towns of Airdrie, Cumbernauld, Dumbarton, Hamilton and Kirkintilloch, Motherwell as well as in the city of Glasgow. A cream and red livery was adopted. In 1990, KCB ceased to operate Scottish Citylink services with the profit margin deemed insufficient. As part of the Scottish Bus Group, only one bid was lodged, a management buyout with the sale effective from 18 February 1991.

KCB relied on second hand purchases until it became profitable. In 1993 the company purchased its first new buses; Alexander Strider bodied Volvo B10Bs, Alexander Dash bodied Volvo B6s and Alexander Royale bodied Volvo Olympians. In October 1994 the business was sold to Strathclyde Buses.

Many of the smaller independent operators that competed heavily with Kelvin Central were successfully purchased, paving the way for Kelvin Central to become the dominant operator once again in much of Lanarkshire but also giving it a rather mixed and sometimes rather elderly fleet.

At that time, Stagecoach Western Scottish were poised to launch a network of Glasgow city services under the Stagecoach Glasgow banner, competing directly with Strathclyde Buses and Kelvin Central. Weeks before these new services were due to commence, Stagecoach acquired a 20% stake in SB Holdings in October 1994 (Strathclyde Buses and Kelvin Central Buses parent group) and a bus war was averted. 

The Monopolies & Mergers Commission found the Stagecoach stake in the combined company to be against the public interest and ordered Stagecoach to divest its 20% share in the firm early in 1995.

The ownership issue was not to be resolved until June 1996, when FirstBus purchased SB Holdings, including Stagecoach's 20% shareholding.

A new all-over red livery was adopted for the combined company, and the KCB Network trading name was replaced with Kelvin, and later First Kelvin. In 1998, Kelvin Central Buses was rebranded as First Glasgow after the sale was approved.

References

External links
First Glasgow website
Kelvin Central page at Central SMT enthusiasts website

Further reading

Defunct companies of Scotland
Former bus operators in Scotland
Transport companies established in 1989
Transport in North Lanarkshire
Transport in South Lanarkshire
1989 establishments in Scotland
1998 disestablishments in Scotland
British companies established in 1989
British companies disestablished in 1998